Milltown railway station is a disused railway station close to the village of Milltown in County Galway. The station was originally opened by the Waterford, Limerick and Western Railway on 30 April 1894 on the route between Limerick and Claremorris. The station was closed completely on 17 June 1963. 

As part of the government's Transport 21 plan, Milltown station was to be re-opened in 2014 under the third stage of the Western Railway Corridor restoration, which would see the section between Tuam and Claremorris re-open. This project is deferred indefinitely.

References

Disused railway stations in County Galway
Proposed railway stations in the Republic of Ireland
Railway stations opened in 1894
Railway stations closed in 1963